Bad Reputation is the third album by the Canadian guitarist David Wilcox. The album includes eleven songs.

Track listing 
 "Bad Reputation" – 2:44
 "Ting Ting" – 3:40
 "Somethin's Shakin'" – 3:42
 "Boogie Ride" – 2:35
 "Cactus" – 3:08
 "Can't Take It Anymore" – 2:18
 "The Grind" – 3:18
 "Love Me Too" – 2:50
 "Preachin' The Blues" – 3:02
 "Brain Fever" – 2:56
 "Play On Your Harp" – 2:12

Personnel 
 David Wilcox - vocals, mandolin, kazoo, guitars
 Dave Flett - guitar
 Stan Szelest - keyboards
 Kit Johnson - bass
 Rob Burns  - bass
 Whitey Glan - drums, percussion
 David Rose - backing vocals
Technical
 Matthew Wiley - photography

References 

1984 albums
David Wilcox (Canadian musician) albums
Capitol Records albums